FRN may refer to:

 Bryant Army Heliport, Alaska, US, IATA code
 Fearn railway station, Scotland, station code
 Federal Reserve Note, a United States banknote
 Feronia Inc., a DR Congo palm oil corporation, TSX stock market code
 First Nation Airways, Nigeria, ICAO code
 Floating rate note, bonds that have a variable coupon
 Food Recovery Network, a US student movement
 FoodRoutes Network, a US sustainable agriculture group
 National Reconstruction Front, a political party in Haiti
 National Renaissance Front, a defunct political party in Romania
 National Revolutionary Front, a political party in Vichy France
 FCC Registration Number, and entity identifier for the FCC Universal Licensing System (ULS)
 Federal Republic of Nigeria